Frank Darby (born September 8, 1997) is an American football wide receiver for the Atlanta Falcons of the National Football League (NFL). He played college football at Arizona State.

Early life and high school
Darby grew up in Jersey City, New Jersey and attended Lincoln High School. Darby was named first-team All-State in 2016 as a senior after 35 receptions for 957 yards and 10 touchdowns on offense and 27 tackles, one interception and three forced fumbles on defense. Darby was rated a three star recruit and initially committed to play college football at Iowa. After initially not qualifying to sign with Iowa due to a low SAT score, he chose Arizona State over offers from Rutgers and Boston College.

College career
Darby redshirted his true freshman season. He finished his redshirt sophomore season with 21 catches for 421 yards and two touchdowns. As a redshirt junior, he caught 31 passes for 616 yards and eight touchdowns. Darby was limited by injury as a senior and appeared in two of the Sun Devils' four games in the COVID-19 shortened Pac-12 season, catching six passes for 46 yards and one touchdown. Darby finished his collegiate career with 1,317 receiving yards on 67 receptions with 13 touchdowns.

Professional career

Darby was selected by the Atlanta Falcons in the sixth round with the 187th pick in the 2021 NFL Draft. He signed his four-year rookie contract with Atlanta on June 15, 2021. Darby made his NFL debut in Week 5 against the New York Jets, playing on special teams. He caught a 14-yard pass from Josh Rosen for his first career reception on November 14, 2021, in a 43-3 loss to the Dallas Cowboys in Week 10.

On August 30, 2022, Darby was waived by the Falcons and re-signed to the practice squad. He was promoted to the active roster on November 23, 2022.

References

External links
Arizona State Sun Devils bio
Atlanta Falcons bio

American football wide receivers
Atlanta Falcons players
Arizona State Sun Devils football players
Lincoln High School (New Jersey) alumni
Players of American football from Jersey City, New Jersey
Living people
1997 births